Courts of Pennsylvania include:
;State courts of Pennsylvania
Supreme Court of Pennsylvania
Superior Court of Pennsylvania (3 districts)
Commonwealth Court of Pennsylvania
Pennsylvania Courts of Common Pleas (60 judicial districts)
Magisterial District Courts

Former colonial and state courts of Pennsylvania
Provincial Court (1684-1722)
Orphans' Courts (1688-1968 when merged with Courts of Common Pleas)
Justice of the Peace Courts (1682 - now Magisterial District Courts)
Court for the Trial of Negroes (1700-1780)
District Courts (1811-1873)
County Courts (1682-1722)
Court of Chancery (1720-1735)
High Court of Errors and Appeals (1780-1808)
Court of Admiralty (1697-1789)
Register's Courts
Courts of Quarter Sessions of the Peace (1682-1969)
Courts of Oyer and Terminer and General Gaol Delivery (1802-1910)

Federal courts located in Pennsylvania
United States Court of Appeals for the Third Circuit (headquartered in Philadelphia, having jurisdiction over the United States District Courts of Delaware, New Jersey, Pennsylvania, and the United States Virgin Islands)
United States District Court for the Eastern District of Pennsylvania
United States District Court for the Middle District of Pennsylvania
United States District Court for the Western District of Pennsylvania

Former federal courts located in Pennsylvania
Court of Appeals in Cases of Capture (1780-1787)
United States District Court for the District of Pennsylvania (1789-1815 when it was subdivided)

References

See also
Unified Judicial System of Pennsylvania

External links
National Center for State Courts - directory of state court websites.
Courts of Pennsylvania in the Seventeenth Century

Courts in the United States
Pennsylvania law